Desert Rat or desert rat or its plural may refer to:

Rodents
Gerbils (Gerbillinae) of the deserts of Africa and Asia
Kangaroo rats (Dipodomys) from North America
Natal multimammate mouse (Mastomys natalensis) from Africa

Military
 Desert Rats, the British 7th Armoured Division in World War II
 The Desert Rats (film), 1953 war film starring Richard Burton
 Operation Desert Rat, a military offensive of the Laotian Civil War

Other
 Desert Research and Technology Studies, or Desert RATS, a set of field trials conducted by NASA
 Desert Rat Scrap Book, a California humor publication (1945–1967) focusing on the American Southwest
 Desert Rats, a book by Charles Lewis Camp

See also
 Desert Rats vs. Afrika Korps, a 2004 real time strategy game based on the North Africa Campaign of World War II
 Desert woodrat, a small species of pack rat native to desert regions of western North America
 The Rat Patrol, an American TV program (1966–1968) loosely based on the North Africa Campaign of World War II
 The Rats of Tobruk, nickname for Allied soldiers holding the Libyan port of Tobruk while under siege in World War II

Animal common name disambiguation pages